Kanematsu (written: 兼松) is both a Japanese surname and a masculine Japanese given name. Notable people with the name include:

Surname
, Japanese samurai
, Japanese rugby sevens player

Given name
, cancer researcher
, Japanese long-distance runner

Japanese-language surnames
Japanese masculine given names